EURECA may refer to:

European Retrievable Carrier, a European Space Agency scientific satellite mission
The European Underground Rare Event Calorimeter Array, a dark matter search experiment

See also 
 Eureka (disambiguation)
 EURECA Program